Keter is a surname of Kenyan origin that may refer to:

Charles Keter (born 1969), Kenyan politician and Member of the National Assembly
Erick Keter (born 1966), Kenyan 400 metres hurdler
Joseph Keter (born 1969), Kenyan steeplechase runner and 1996 Olympic champion

See also
Keter Betts (1928–2005), American jazz double bassist
Kipketer, related name meaning "son of Keter"

Kalenjin names